Lota Schwager is a Chilean professional team based in Coronel that currently play in Tercera A (fourth-tier).

History
Following the merger between Federico Schwager and Minas Lota (teams that competed in Campeonato Regional de Concepción representing Lota and Schwager companies), the club was established on 10 May 1966 under the name of "Lota Schwager", making reference to both companies latest mentioned. Having their debut–season the same year (where they finished ninth, after a poor campaign), "The Little Lamp" under the coach Isaac Carrasco achieved its first promotion to top-division in 1969, where Coronel-based team remained until 1980.

After they won their second Primera B title in 1986, Lota returned to first-tier thanks to manager Juan Carlos Gangas' job, but they only stayed at Primera División one season, after of defeat the Promotion Play-offs against O'Higgins and Regional Atacama. Following Coronel mining-crisis of 1994, the club disappeared during seven years, starting out again in 2001 for play as an amateur team in Tercera División, winning that in they first attempt to reach it.

In 2006, after a good campaign in secondgontier (where even so were four managers who coached Lota: Leonardo Vinés, Humberto López, Márcio da Silva and Jaime Nova), finishing third in the table behind the champion Deportes Melipilla and runner-up Ñublense, the team played the Promotion Play-offs against Talca-based club Rangers, which won at their home stadium Federico Schwager on the penalties thanks to Cristián Limenza's performances in the goal saving penalties.

Honours
Primera B: 2
1969, 1986

Tercera División Chilena: 1
2001

Current squad

Managers
 Francisco Valdés (1992)
 Germán Corengia (2013–14)

Players
  John Crawley

See also
Chilean football league system

References

External links
Club Website 

 
Football clubs in Chile
Association football clubs established in 1966
Sport in Biobío Region
1966 establishments in Chile